Blue and White may refer to:

 Israeli flag
 Blue and White (political alliance), an active Israeli political alliance
 Flag of Greece
The Blue and White, a magazine written by undergraduates at Columbia University
 Power Macintosh G3 (Blue & White)
 Toronto Maple Leafs or Blue and White, a National Hockey League team
 Blue and White (album), a 1984 album by guitarist Doug Raney
 "Blue and White" (Duke fight song), for Duke University and its athletic teams
 "The Blue and White", a University of Toronto athletics fight song
 University of Connecticut known for their colors, blue and white

See also
 Blue and white porcelain, a portion of Chinese culture
 Blue-and-white flycatcher, a migratory songbird from Asia
 Blue-and-white mockingbird, from Central America
 Blue-and-white swallow, a passerine bird from South America
 Goodbye Blue & White, an album by Less Than Jake
 The White and Blue, former name of Brigham Young University's student paper